Helena Klakočar (born 1958) is a Croatian artist alternative cartoonist known for her autobiographical, social, and political observations.

Life and work
Helena Klakočar was born in Tuzla, Bosnia and Herzegovina, into an ethnic Croat family. When she was seven years old her family moved to Maribor, Slovenia, where she attended primary and grammar school.

She studied graphic art at the Art Academy in Zagreb, Croatia and became successful as a comics author, designer of posters and animation films. 

In summer 1991 she went on a sailing holiday with her husband and two-year-old daughter. Their return from Greece was prolonged because of the outburst of the war in Former Yugoslavia. On a small catamaran during the winter she was capturing daily life and memories of her homeland in drawings and text, depicted in her award-winning graphic novel "Restless Sea 1" (in French "Passage en douce") which is translated into several languages.

She received a grant by Fonds BKVB, Amsterdam, and later from Centre de la livre, Paris, to continue with this story.

Bibliography

Comics
  
 2020 book REVOLT published by Vedis, Zagreb
 

 2019 ;Publishing house VEDIS from  Zagreb published her book ''WALL MEDITERRANEAN'', graphic reportage based on the interviews  with the crew of the Croatian search and rescuing  boat BŠ-72 Andrija Mohorovičić who was involved in the operation Triton (Frontex)

 graphic novel "Friesland (Restless Sea 2), 2009, Fabrika knjiga, Belgrade, Serbia,

 "Groote Reis", 2003, Aristej, Maribor, Slovenia

 graphic novel "Passage en Douce (Restless Sea 1)", 1999, Freon, Bruxelles, Belgium (2000 - Prix Alph-Art du Meilleur Album Étranger for graphic novel Passage en douce, Festival d'Angoulême, France)

Films
 "Dance, Monster, on my gentle melody” with group Zzot, Zagreb, 1985 (awarded in Belgrade, 1986)
 "Tai Chi" (with M. Manojlovic), Zagreb film studio, Zagreb, 1989
 "What happened with my friends", animation part in the P.de Pierpont film, Bruxelles, Belgium (film received many international awards).

Animated Films
 Propagand film for the Gallery SC, 1990/91, 4x 30 sec
 Realization of the ZZOTROPHE machine on the enlarged scale (5x5 m) for exhibition of the art groups in Marseilles, France, 1989.

Awards

 2019 - project resident at Cite International des arts, Paris

 2016 - project resident at RECOLLETS Paris , City of Paris and Instituit Francais

 2000 - Prix Alph-Art du Meilleur Album Étranger for graphic novel Passage en douce, Festival d'Angoulême, France

 2000 - Prix du Radio Info, for Passage en douce, France

 2000 - "1st award for illustration", Stichting Tussen Hemel en Aarde, Netherland
 2000 - Stipendium Centre de la Livre, Paris, France
 2001 - Work stipendium Fonds voor Kunst en Arhitektur, Amsterdam, Netherland
 2002 - "The picture which was never taken”, Helsinki, Finland, lecture on symposia about graphic novells.
 2003 - Guest artist Academia Solitude, Stuttgart, Germany.

Notes

External links
 
 Entry about Helena Klakocar in Duch Encyclopedia of Comics
 Presentation for "City of Women" Festival
 Quote

Interviews 
 Interview in Delo's publication
 Interview  in Dnevnik's publication

Alternative cartoonists
1958 births
Living people
Bosnia and Herzegovina women artists
Bosnia and Herzegovina artists
20th-century Bosnia and Herzegovina artists
21st-century Bosnia and Herzegovina artists